Giacomo Valentini (born May 16, 1911 in Rome) was an Italian professional football player.

He played 6 games and scored 1 goal in the Serie A 1935/36 season for A.S. Roma.

1911 births
Year of death missing
Italian footballers
Serie A players
A.S. Roma players
Association football midfielders